Prateek Kuhad is an Indian singer-songwriter and musician who makes independent music in Hindi and English. He is best known for his track "cold/mess".

Early life and career
Kuhad was born in Jaipur, Rajasthan in a Hindu Jat family and has two sisters. He learnt to play the guitar at age of 16 and started songwriting in his late teens. He finished his high school from Maharaja Sawai Man Singh Vidyalaya, Jaipur. Later, He studied Maths and Economics at New York University before moving to Delhi to pursue a full-time career in music. After graduating from New York University, he returned to India, releasing a pair of EPs before releasing his debut album. He also signed a publishing deal with Los Angeles-based company Cutcraft Music. Kuhad became the first Indian to get signed by the American record label Elektra Records in 2020.

Musical style and influences
During his time in NYU, Kuhad discovered Elliott Smith's music which had a great influence on him. He then discovered other singer-songwriters such as Bob Dylan and Woody Guthrie along with newer artists like Laura Marling and Fleet Foxes. These artists inspired him to get better at guitar and start writing his own songs. These went on to become his major influences.

Kuhad was comfortable with communicating in both English and Hindi from the start and has been writing in both the languages. In his childhood, as there was no internet service in Jaipur, he predominantly listened to Indian pop and Bollywood music and only occasionally to Western music.He is also said to be inspired from a kid of the same name as his whose vocals were outstanding, sometime during his visit to UP. He was also inspired by Lucky Ali.

The acoustic guitar is Kuhad's primary instrument while he also plays piano and electric guitar. His music leans towards Americana and folk genres with acoustic sounds and unconventional song structures for most parts. His music has been praised as being "beautifully haunting" by Us Weekly and his vocals as being "angelic" by BrooklynVegan.

He mostly writes about love, relationships and his experiences, with vague lyrics that are open to interpretation.

Awards and recognition

 Indian Indie Album of the Year 2019 by iTunes and Spotify: Top Indian Indie Hits
 The Best India Act at the 2016 MTV Europe Music Awards
 Best Pop Artist Award at the Radio City Freedom Awards 2018

Kuhad's 2018 song "cold/mess" was featured on former US president Barack Obama's "Favorite Music of 2019" list.

Discography

Albums & EPs

Singles & collaborations

Film/Series songs

References

External links 

 

Indian male singer-songwriters
Indian singer-songwriters
1990 births
Living people
New York University alumni
Musicians from Jaipur
MTV Europe Music Award winners